Muhammad bin Tughluq (1290 – 20 March 1351), also named Juna Khan as Crown Prince, was the eighteenth Sultan of Delhi. He reigned from February 1325 until his death in 1351. The sultan was the eldest son of Ghiyath al-Din Tughluq, founder of the Tughlaq dynasty. In 1321, the young Muhammad was sent by his father to the Deccan Plateau to fight a military campaign against the Kakatiya dynasty. In 1323, the future sultan successfully laid siege upon the Kakatiya capital in Warangal. This victory over King Prataparudra ended the Kakatiya dynasty. 

Muhammad ascended to the Delhi throne upon his father's death in 1325. Accounts by visitors of the Sultan Muhammad n describe him as an "inhuman eccentric" with bizarre character. The sultan is said to have ordered the massacre of all the inhabitants of the Hindu city of Kannauj. He is also known for his wild policy swings. 

Muhammad bin Tughluq had an interest in medicine. He was also skilled in several languages: Persian, Hindavi, Arabic, Sanskrit and Turkish. Ibn Battuta, the famous traveler and jurist from Morocco, wrote in his book about his time at the Sultan's court.

Early life
Muhammad bin Tughluq was born to Ghiyath al-Din Tughluq, who founded the Tughlaq dynasty after taking control of the Delhi Sultanate. He is also known as Prince Fakhr Malik Jauna Khan, Juna Khan or Ulugh Khan. Jauna Khan remarked that he was "bound to all Indians by ties of blood and relation."

Ascending the throne 

After the death of his father Ghiyasuddin Tughlaq, Muhammad bin Tughlaq ascended the throne of Tughlaq dynasty of Delhi in February, 1325 CE. In his reign, he conquered Warangal (in present-day Telangana, India), Ma'abar (Kayalpatnam) and Madurai (Tamil Nadu, India), and areas up to the modern day southern tip of the Indian state of Karnataka. In the conquered territories, Tughluq created a new set of revenue officials to assess the financial aspects of the area. Their accounts helped the audit in the office of the wazir.

Robert Sewell quotes from visitor accounts atrocities during the rule of Muhammad bin Tughluq. He is said to have ordered the massacre of all the inhabitants of the Hindu city of Kanauj. He also decided to transfer his capital from Delhi to Devagiri, which are 600 miles apart, then ordered the people to move back to Delhi. Thousands of people including women and children died during the journey. However, Muhammad bin Tughluq was also known for his tolerance to other religions.  Several historians mention that the Sultan honoured the Jain monk Jinaprabha Suri during the year 1328. Peter Jackson mentions that Muhammad was the only Sultan who participated in Hindu festivities.

Moving of the capital 

In 1327, Tughluq ordered to move his capital from Delhi to Daulatabad  (also known as Devagiri) (in present-day Maharashtra) in the Deccan region of India. Muhammad bin Tughlaq himself had spent a number of years as a prince on campaign in the southern states during the reign of his father. Daulatabad was also situated at a central place so the administration of both the north and the south could be possible. These elite colonists from Delhi were Urdu-speakers, who carried the Urdu language to the Deccan. These immigrants included Hasan Gangu, a celebrated general who would later found the Bahmanid Empire.

All facilities were provided for those who were required to migrate to Daulatabad. It is believed that the general public of Delhi was not in favor of shifting the base to Daulatabad.

A broad road was constructed for convenience. Shady trees were planted on both sides of the road; he set up halting stations at an interval of two miles. Provisions for food and water were also made available at the stations. Tughluq established a khanqah at each of the stations where at least one sufi saint was stationed. A regular postal service was established between Delhi and Daulatabad. In 1329, his mother also went to Daulatabad, accompanied by the nobles. By around the same year, Tughluq summoned all the slaves, nobles, servants, ulema, sufis to the new capital. The new capital was divided into wards called mohalla with separate quarters for different people like soldiers, poets, judges, nobles. Grants were also given by Tughluq to the immigrants. Even though the citizens migrated, they showed dissent. In the process, many died on the road due to hunger and exhaustion. Moreover, coins minted in Daulatabad around 1333, showed that Daulatabad was "the second capital".

In 1334, there was a rebellion in Mabar, led by the North Indian Muslim soldier, Jalaluddin Ahsan Khan Kaithali, a native of Kaithal in North India, who founded the Madurai Sultanate. While on his way to suppress the rebellion, there was an outbreak of bubonic plague at Bidar due to which Tughluq himself became ill, and many of his soldiers died. While he retreated back to Daulatabad, Mabar and Dwarsamudra broke away from Tughluq's control. This was followed by a revolt in Bengal. Fearing that the sultanate's northern borders were exposed to attacks, in 1335, he decided to shift the capital back to Delhi, allowing the citizens to return to their previous city.

Impact 
While most of the Medieval historians, including Barani and Ibn Battuta, tend to have implied that Delhi was entirely emptied (as is famously mentioned by Barani that not a dog or cat was left), it is generally believed that this is just an exaggeration. Such exaggerated accounts simply imply that Delhi suffered a downfall in its stature and trade. Besides, it is believed that only the powerful and nobility suffered hardships if any. Two Sanskrit inscriptions dated 1327 and 1328 C.E. confirm this view and establish the prosperity of the Hindus of Delhi and its vicinity at that time.

Although this decision was unpopular among the Muslim elite, one impact of this decision was that Islamic rule in Deccan lasted centuries longer than the Delhi's own unstable authority over the south. If not for Tughlaq's creation of a Muslim elite at Daulatabad, there would have been no stable Muslim power like the Bahmani Sultanate to check the rising power of the Hindu Vijayanagara Empire.

Expeditions 
After the death of Genghis Khan, one line of his descendants, the Chagatai Khanate, ruled over Turkistan and Transoxiana and another branch of Hulagu Khan conquered present day Iran and Iraq.  However, at the time of Tughlaq, both of the dynasties were on the downfall, with conditions in Transoxiana unstable after the death of Tarmashirin. He was ambitious of annexing these kingdoms. He invited nobles and leaders from these regions and gave them grants. Partly with their help and partly from his own kingdom, Tughluq raised an army of possibly up to 370,000 soldiers in 1329. Barani has written that Tughluq took no step to check the ability of the soldiers or the brand of horses. They were paid in one year advance, and after being kept idle for one year, Tughluq found it difficult to pay them. Therefore, he decided to disperse and dissolve the soldiers in 1329.

In 1333, Muhammad Bin Tughlaq led the Qarachil expedition to the Kullu-Kangra region of modern-day Himachal Pradesh in India. Historians like Badauni and Ferishta wrote that Tughluq originally wanted to cross the Himalayas and invade China. However, he faced local resistance in Himachal. Prithvi Chand II of the Hindu Rajput kingdom of Katoch clan of Kangra  defeated the army of Muhammad Bin Tughlaq which was not able to fight in the hills. Nearly all his 100,000 soldiers perished and were forced to retreat.

Death and ensuing collapse of the empire 
Muhammad Bin Tughlaq died in 1351 on his way to Thatta,  Sindh, while he was campaigning in Sindh against Taghi, a Turkic slave tribe. It was during his reign that the Sultanate of Delhi collapsed by twofold resistance. One was from Rajputs led by Hammir Singh of Mewar, and the other from Harihara  and Bukka  of South India. While Rana Hammir Singh liberated the strategic Rajputana following the victory in Battle of Singoli in 1336, Harihara and Bukka established a new empire called Vijayanagara Empire, by initially defeating and later ending Madurai Sultanate that was ruling the city of Madurai and its environs of South India on behalf of Delhi Sultanate. Several other south Indian rulers like Musunuri Kaapaaneedu, etc. also contributed to the downfall of the Islamic Sultanate of Delhi. To add to Tughluq's woes, his own generals rebelled against him. One of his generals, a North Indian Muslim named Hasan Gangu, would go on to form the Bahmani Sultanate in the Deccan.

Token 

Historian Ishwari Prasad writes that different coins of different shapes and sizes were produced by his mints which lacked the artistic perfection of design and finish. In 1330, after his failed expedition to Deogiri, he issued token currency; that is coins of brass and copper were minted whose value was equal to that of gold and silver coins. Historian Ziauddin Barani felt that this step was taken by Tughluq as he wanted to annex all the inhabited areas of the world for which a treasury was required to pay the army. Barani had also written that the sultan's treasury had been exhausted by his action of giving rewards and gifts in gold. In the rural areas, officials like the muqaddams paid the revenue in brass and copper coins and also used the same coins to purchase arms and horses. As a result, the value of coins decreased, and, in the words of Satish Chandra, the coins became "as worthless as stones". This also disrupted trade and commerce. The token currency had inscriptions in Persian and Arabic marking the use of new coins instead of the royal seal and so the citizens could not distinguish between the official and the forged coins. Records show that the use of token currency had stopped by 1333 as Ibn Battuta who came to Delhi in 1334, wrote a journal which made no mention of this currency.

Religious policy
There are conflicting views expressed by historians on his religious tolerance. While visitors Ibn Battuta, Nunez and Firistha mention that Muhammed Bin Tughlaq showed  intolerance to other religions, on the contrary, Peter Jackson mentions that Muhammed was the only Sultan who participated in Hindu festivities. Ibn Battuta mentions that the king of China (the Yuan Emperor) had sent an embassy to Muhammad for reconstruction of a sacked temple at Sambhal. The envoys were however denied with the statement that only those living in a Muslim territory who paid the jizya could be permitted to restore a temple. Firuz Shah Tughlaq had claimed that before his rule, idol-temples had been permitted to be rebuilt contrary to the Sharia.

The contemporaneous Jain authorities attests Muhammad cordial relations with the Jains and further showing favour to the Jain scholars.

Personality
Tughluq was a strict Muslim, maintaining his five prayers during a day, used to fast in Ramadan. According to 19th century CE British historian Stanley Lane-Poole, apparently courtesans had hailed Tughluq as a "man of knowledge" and had an interest in subjects like philosophy, medicine, mathematics, religion, Persian and Urdu/Hindustani poetry. In his  "Medieval India", "He was perfect in the humanities of his day, a keen student of Persian poetry... a master of style, supremely eloquent in an age of rhetoric, a philosopher trained in Logic and Greek metaphysics, with whom scholars feared to argue, a mathematician and lover of science." Barani has written that Tughluq wanted the traditions of the nubuwwah to be followed in his kingdom. Even though he did not believe in mysticism, Chandra states that he respected the Sufi saints, which is evident from the fact of his building of the mausoleum of the saint Nizamuddin Auliya at Nizamuddin Dargah. Critics have called him hasty in nature, owing to most of his experiments failing due to lack of preparation. Ibn Battuta has also written that he depended on his own judgment and rarely took advice from others and has also criticized him for his giving of excessive gifts and "harsh punishments". He was famous because whenever a gift was bestowed upon him, he would give gifts worth three times the value to show his stature.

In popular culture
 Tughlaq, a Kannada play about his life was written by Indian writer Girish Karnad in 1968.
 Muhammad bin Tughluq is a 1968 Indian Tamil-language political satire play written by Cho Ramaswamy (who also played the titular role).
 Muhammad bin Tughluq (1971) is an Indian satirical film in Tamil based on the play by Ramaswamy.
 Mohammad Bin Tuglaq, an Indian Telugu-language film by B. V. Prasad released in 1972. It was a remake of the Tamil film.
 Thuglak is an Indian weekly news magazine published in Tamil. It was started by Cho Ramaswamy in 1970 and was named after the emperor (who also serves as its mascot).
 Doordarshan presented an episode with Muhammad bin Tughluq as a character in its series, Upanishad Ganga.
 Tughlaq is a term still used in contemporary times to tease someone when they do something illogical or counter-intuitive.
 Indian historical fiction author Anuja Chandramouli wrote Muhammad Bin Tughlaq: Tale of a Tyrant on Tughlaq which was published by Penguin Random House.

Footnotes

References

Bibliography

External links
 
 
 Encyclopædia Britannica – Muhammad ibn Tughluq

Muhammad Bin
1300 births
1351 deaths
14th-century Indian Muslims
People from Thatta District
14th-century Indian monarchs
14th-century Turkic people
14th century in India